Akkineni Naga Chaitanya (born 23 November 1986) is an Indian actor who primarily works in Telugu cinema. He made his acting debut with Josh (2009) and his breakthrough came with Gautham Vasudev Menon-directed Ye Maaya Chesave (2010). He has won several film awards including Filmfare Award for Best Male Debut – South, Nandi Award for Best Supporting Actor and SIIMA Award for Best Actor (Critics).

In his initial years he appeared in successful films including 100% Love (2011), Tadakha (2013) and Manam (2014) along with few films that did not perform well. Chaitanya is known for his notable work in films such as Premam (2016), Majili (2019), Venky Mama (2019), Love Story (2021) and Bangarraju (2022).

He married actress Samantha Ruth Prabhu in October 2017, but they got separated in October 2021.

Early life 

Chaitanya was born on  23 November 1986 in Hyderabad to actor Akkineni Nagarjuna and Lakshmi Daggubati. His paternal grandfather, actor Akkineni Nageswara Rao and his maternal grandfather, producer D. Ramanaidu are prominent figures in Telugu cinema. Chaitanya's parents got divorced when he was a child. Both his parents later remarried. While Nagarjuna married former actress Amala Mukherjee, Lakshmi married Sharath Vijayaraghavan, a corporate executive at Sundaram Motors. Chaitanya has a paternal half-brother, actor Akhil Akkineni and a maternal step brother. His maternal uncle Venkatesh and first cousins Rana Daggubati, Sumanth and Sushanth are also actors.

Chaitanya grew up in Chennai, where he was raised for 18 and a half years. He was educated at Padma Seshadri Bala Bhavan, Chennai and at AMM School, Chennai. He then completed his graduation from St. Mary's College, Hyderabad. He expressed his desire to Nagarjuna to take up acting as his profession during his second year in college. He enrolled in a three-month acting course in Mumbai. He received further training in acting and martial arts in Los Angeles, apart from taking voice and dialogue coaching for one year before making his acting debut.

Career

Debut and breakthrough (2009–2012) 
Chaitanya debuted in 2009 with the film Josh, directed by Vasu Varma, in which he played a college student. Rediff.com wrote: "As a debutant, Naga Chaitanya has performed well. He has his moments where he's proven himself. There is always scope for improvement and one hopes that he will hone his skills in the years to come." Chaitanya won the Filmfare Award South for Best Male Debut.

He next starred in the 2010 romantic drama Ye Maaya Chesave, directed by Gautham Vasudev Menon, which was simultaneously shot in Tamil as Vinnaithaandi Varuvaayaa, with a different cast and climax. He played a Hindu Telugu assistant director who falls in love with a Christian Malayali girl. A reviewer from Sify.com wrote: "Naga Chaitanya is at home in romantic scenes. His asset is his voice and his casual acting style. Chaitanya has improved his performance from his first film. He can now confidently act in more romantic films and strengthen his position." However, the reviewer felt that he should concentrate on his looks as he felt that Chaitanya looked "very boyish". The film was a success at the box office and went on to receive a cult status. He also received a nomination for Filmfare Award South for Best Actor Male.

After Ye Maaya Chesave, he paired up with Sukumar in 2011 for another love story titled 100% Love, in which he played a studious and egotistical college student who is the top ranker of his college. His next film was Dhada (2011). The film's story is based on an engineering graduate student who was to complete his studies in the US and return to India in another 10 days. The Times of India wrote: "After good performances in his last two films, Naga Chaitanya doesn't live up to expectations. He has the same expression stuck on his face throughout the movie."

His next release that year was Bejawada, directed by Vivek Krishna. The film saw Chaitanya portraying the role of a college student-turned-gangster. The film received negative reviews, with critics calling it his worst film. His performance was also panned by critics. The Times of India wrote: "This film might have even outdone "Dhada", in being called the worst film of Chaitanya's career. While the young actor still needs to work on his facial expressions, he was saddled with a poorly sketched character in this film, devoid of all heroism, and he fails to rise above it."

Career fluctuation with few successes (2013–2018) 
Chaitanya's next film, Tadakha in 2013, was an official remake of N. Lingusamy's Tamil action film Vettai. The Hindu wrote: "Naga Chaitanya shows tremendous improvement even his last outing, the debacle called Bejawada. He is in sync with his role, exudes over confidence and seems to have had funny stunt sequences and comic portions. Reprising a role played by an established actor like Arya is no mean task and Chaitanya pulls it off rather well." The film was commercially successful, giving the actor a much needed break.

In 2014, Chaitanya appeared in the period-drama Manam, which also featured his grandfather, Akkineni Nageswara Rao, and father, Nagarjuna. He played two roles in the film, which were of a middle class father in 1983 and a happy-go-lucky college student. Deccan Chronicle wrote: "Naga Chaitanya has done a decent job and compared to his earlier films he matured a lot as an actor." Sify.com wrote "There is lot of improvement in Naga Chaitanya's acting. He looks natural and has done justice to his role."

His next release was the political-drama Autonagar Surya, directed by Deva Katta, in which he played Surya, a skilled mechanic. Upon release, the film received mixed reviews from critics, who however appreciated Chaitanya's performance in the film calling it one of his best efforts. The film ended up as a flop. The Hindu wrote: "One rarely gets to see Naga Chaitanya smiling in this film. Chaitanya brings in the right amount of grit and intensity required for his role and shows that he can carry a film on his shoulders with the help of an able director."

He later starred in romantic comedy Oka Laila Kosam. The Times of India wrote, "Oka Laila Kosam is a simple love story which doesn't quite leave you with a big smile on your face, but it has enough mojo, if you are a big sucker for romance."

In 2015, he played the lead in the action-crime drama Dohchay, directed by Sudheer Varma. Later that year, he was brought aboard for Gautham Vasudev Menon's bilingual romantic thriller film Sahasam Swasaga Sagipo.

In 2016, he starred in the remake of the 2015 Malayalam cult-romantic film Premam, of the same name, alongside Shruti Hassan. After the success of Premam, his next release was Sahasam Swasaga Sagipo, released two days after demonetization,  received positive reviews. and won him critical acclaim but no commercial success.

In 2017, he had two releases. The family drama Rarandoi Veduka Chudham, directed by Kalyan Krishna and the thriller film Yuddham Sharanam.

In 2018, he starred in a brief role in the Savitri's biopic, Mahanati, directed by Nag Ashwin, which was a huge hit. He played his grandfather Nageswara Rao. In the same year, he starred in Maruthi-directed Shailaja Reddy Alludu alongside Anu Emmanuel and Ramya Krishna. The Times of India wrote, "Some preaching, some family drama, some humour and Shailaja Reddy Alludu plays safe for a festive release." Two months later, his next film, the thriller Savyasachi directed by Chandoo Mondeti featured Chaitanya in the role of an ambidextrous man.

Acclaimed success and further career (2019–present) 

In 2019, Chaitanya featured in Majili along with his then wife Samantha Akkineni in their fourth film together. Later that year, he starred in Venky Mama alongside his maternal uncle Venkatesh. The film directed by K. S. Ravindra, and produced by his uncle D. Suresh Babu was a profitable venture, grossing .

In 2021, he starred in the film Love Story with Sai Pallavi. His performance was called one of his best by Neeshita Nyayapati of The Times of India and Hindustan Times Haricharan Pudipeddi stated: "In spite of the hurried climax and the predictable ending, the film works to a large extent because of its sensible treatment and earnest performances of Naga Chaitanya and Sai Pallavi, who complement each other so well."

In 2022, Chaitanya appeared in Bangarraju along with his father, Nagarjuna. Anji Shetty of Sakshi stated that Nagarjuna and he were the core strength of the film. The film received mixed reviews but was a commercial success. He next appeared in Thank You with Raashi Khanna. The film received mixed to negative reviews, Neeshita Nyayapati of The Times of India wrote "Thank You doesn’t offer anything fresh in terms of the story or the performances".

Upcoming projects

Chaitanya will make his Hindi film debut in 2022 with Laal Singh Chaddha. He will also appear in Venkat Prabhu's bilingual film, Custody, alongside Krithi Shetty. It will mark his Tamil debut. Chaitanya will make his web debut with Vikram Kumar's web series, Dhootha, for Amazon Prime Video. He also has a film with Parasuram in the pipeline.

Personal life 

After being in a relationship since November 2015, Chaitanya got engaged to actress Samantha Ruth Prabhu on 29 January 2017. Later that year, they married in Goa, in a Hindu religious ceremony on 6 October and a Christian ceremony on 7 October. Both were private ceremonies, where only close friends and family were present. The public knew them as "ChaySam". After much speculated rumours, Chaitanya and Samantha announced their separation on 2 October 2021, ending their four years of marriage.

In the media
Chaitanya is one of the most popular and highest paid Telugu actors. He has  featured on Hyderabad Times Most Desirable Men list various times. He ranked 12th in 2017, 7th in 2018, 11th in 2019 and 6th in 2020.

Filmography

Films 
 All films are in Telugu, otherwise noted

Web series

Awards and nominations

References

External links 
 
 

Living people
Telugu male actors
Male actors from Hyderabad, India
Male actors in Telugu cinema
Male actors from Chennai
Filmfare Awards South winners
21st-century Indian male actors
1986 births
New York Film Academy alumni
Nandi Award winners
Santosham Film Awards winners
Male actors from Andhra Pradesh
CineMAA Awards winners